William Stedman Greene (April 28, 1841 – September 22, 1924) was a United States representative from Massachusetts.

Biography
William S. Greene was born in Tremont, Illinois on April 28, 1841. He moved with his parents to Fall River, Massachusetts in 1844.

He attended the public schools and engaged in the real estate and insurance business. He married Mary E. White on March 8, 1865.

He was a member of the common council, and served as president of that body 1877-1879.  He served as Mayor of Fall River in 1880, and was reelected the following year, but resigned soon after assuming the position. Greene was appointed postmaster of Fall River on March 22, 1881, and served until March 30, 1885. He again served as Mayor 1886 and 1895-1897. He served as general superintendent of State prisons 1888-1898, was reappointed postmaster of Fall River and served from March 9, to July 1, 1898, when he resigned to run for Congress.

He was elected as a Republican to the Fifty-fifth Congress to fill the vacancy caused by the death of John Simpkins.  He was reelected to the Fifty-sixth and to the twelve succeeding Congresses and served from May 31, 1898, until his death in Fall River on September 22, 1924.

He served as chairman of the Committee on Expenditures in the Department of the Navy for the Fifty-eighth Congress, and the Committee on Merchant Marine and Fisheries (Sixtieth, Sixty-first, and Sixty-sixth through Sixty-eighth Congresses).

His interment was in Oak Grove Cemetery.

See also
List of United States Congress members who died in office (1900–49)

References

1841 births
1924 deaths
Mayors of Fall River, Massachusetts
Massachusetts city council members
Republican Party members of the United States House of Representatives from Massachusetts